Sonia Holm (24 February 1922 – 2 July 1974) was an English film actress. She trained at the Rank Organisation's "charm school".

Filmography
 The Loves of Joanna Godden (1947)
 When the Bough Breaks (1947)
 Miranda (1948)
 Broken Journey (1948)
 The Calendar (1948)
 Warning to Wantons (1949)
 The Bad Lord Byron (1949)
 Stop Press Girl (1949)
 13 East Street (1952)
 The Crowded Day (1954)
 Radio Cab Murder (1954)

References

External links
 

1922 births
1974 deaths
English film actresses
People from Sutton, London
Actresses from London
20th-century English actresses